The  was an infantry division of the Imperial Japanese Army. The 50th Division was activated in Taipei 3 May 1944, utilizing a buildings previously used by 48th division, and was one of only two Japanese divisions (together with 66th division) ever raised on Taiwan. The 50th division have employed the casualties of the 48th division transported back to Taiwan to form the divisional core.

The 50th division was permanently assigned to the Japanese Tenth Area Army (and to the 40th army in time it was based on Taiwan in early 1945).

During the 1945, the 50th division have fortified in Kaohsiung on the south coast of Taiwan in anticipation of the Allies landing. It meet the day of surrender of Japan 15 August 1945 without engaging in actual combat and was demobilized shortly afterwards.

See also
 List of Japanese Infantry Divisions

Notes
This article incorporates material from Japanese Wikipedia page 第50師団 (日本軍), accessed 1 June 2016

See also
 List of Japanese Infantry Divisions

Reference and further reading

 Madej, W. Victor. Japanese Armed Forces Order of Battle, 1937-1945 [2 vols] Allentown, PA: 1981

Japanese World War II divisions
Infantry divisions of Japan
Military units and formations established in 1944
Military units and formations disestablished in 1945
1944 establishments in Japan
1945 disestablishments in Japan